Fritzi Burr (May 31, 1924 – January 17, 2003) was an American character actress that was most notable for her roles as Miss Collins on the sitcom What's Happening!! and as various comedic foils to Fred Sanford on the sitcom Sanford and Son in the 1970's. She was the sister-in-law of Sanford and Son producer Saul Turteltaub.

Biography
Burr was born Freda Berr in Philadelphia on May 31 1924 to Pauline Berr (née Devore) and David Berr. Not only parents were both Russian Jews, but their families came from the same city, Berdichev. Even father's original last name, Berdichevsky, as it was before it was shortened to Berr, is also derived from the name of their native town. Parents divorced while she was little, and her mother took her to live with her parents, Harry and Rose Devore. A few years later, Mother would remarry and have two more daughters, Shirley and Thelma, by her second husband Benjamin Steinberg. In the late 1930s the family moved from Philadelphia to Newark, NJ, where Freda spent her formative in the close proximity of New York stage scene. Eventually, her stepfather formally adopted her and from then on she would be known officially as Freda Steinberg, keeping a slightly modified Burr as the stage name.

Burr performed in little theater and in skits with the vaudeville comedy team of Smith and Dale. By the late 1950s, she was working on Broadway and appeared in I Can Get It for You Wholesale, the show in which Barbra Streisand first gained national attention.  Later, Burr replaced Kaye Medford as the mother of Fanny Brice (played by Streisand) in Funny Girl (1968). Her Broadway credits included portraying Sylvia Goldman in The Family Way (1965).

Burr worked regularly in small theaters and dinner theaters and in touring companies of such musicals as Fiddler on the Roof, in which she played, at different times, Yente and Tevye's long-suffering wife, Golde. Moving to Hollywood, she found steady work as a character actress in movies and on television.

Burr appeared in the movies How Do I Love Thee? (1970), Frasier, The Senusous Lion (1973), Chinatown (1974), The New, Original Wonder Woman (1975), Mary Jane Harper Cried Last Night (1977), and 3 Ninjas (1992). Her television appearances include The Rockford Files (6 different roles in 6 episodes), What's Happening! (as the high school teacher, Mrs. Collins in 7 episodes), The Nanny, Melrose Place, Hunter, The Golden Girls, The Incredible Hulk, NBC-TV's Sanford and Son, Seinfeld, Friends and The Odd Couple.

Personal life and death
Burr was married to Aaron Hyman until his death in 1995. Burr died in Fort Myers, Florida of natural causes on January 17, 2003, aged 78.

Filmography

Television 
 1967, N.Y.P.D. (1 episode) as Landlady
 1970, That Girl (1 episode) as Laura
 1973,  A Touch of Grace (1 episode) as Mrs. Sherman
 1973, The New Dick Van Dyke Show (1 episode) as Mrs. Davis 
 1973 – 1974, Love, American Style (2 episodes) as Mabel/The Moderator
 1974 – 1975, The Odd Couple (2 episodes) as Angry Woman/Mrs. Perkins
 1974 – 1977, Sanford and Son (10 episodes) as various
 1975, The ABC Afternoon Playbreak (1 episode) as Florence Darwin
 1975, Baretta (1 episode) as Mrs. Schwartz
 1975, The Rookies (1 episode) as Apartment House Manager
 1975, Wonder Woman (1 episode) as Saleslady
 1975 – 1979, The Rockford Files (6 episodes) as various
 1976, One Day at a Time (1 episode) as Ginny
 1976, Harry O (1 episode) as Apartment Manager
 1976, Starsky and Hutch (1 episode) as Mrs. Haberman
 1976, Holmes & Yoyo (1 episode) as Mrs. Buchanan
 1976, Police Woman (1 episode) as Landlady
 1977, Sanford Arms (1 episode) as Secretary
 1977 – 1979, What's Happening!! (7 episodes) as Miss Collins
 1979, Delta House (1 episode) as Gretl Kemp
 1979, Detective School (2 episodes) as Madame Duchamp
 1979, The Incredible Hulk (2 episodes) as Rose Brown/Gladys
 1979 – 1982, Quincy M.E. (3 episodes) as Dr. Finkel/Maybelle/Doreen
 1980, One in a Million (1 episode) as Nurse
 1981, Strike Force (1 episode) as Mrs. Greenstreet
 1982, One of the Boys (1 episode) as The Bank Manager
 1982, Maggie (1 episode) as Mrs. Spaulding
 1983, The Facts of Life (1 episode) as Mrs. Waldman
 1985, Crazy Like a Fox (1 episode) as Mabel
 1985, Days of our Lives (4 episodes) as Beulah Boden
 1986, Divorce Court (1 episode) as Marianne Walker
 1986, You Again? (2 episodes) as Mabel
 1987, Throb (1 episode) as Makler
 1988, The Golden Girls (1 episode) as Ruth
 1988, My Sister Sam (1 episode) as Checker
 1989, Moonlighting (1 episode) as Lenora Viola
 1989, Chicken Soup (1 episode) as Lillian
 1991, Hunter (1 episode) as Ida Green
 1991, Dream On (1 episode) as Waitress
 1992, Sisters (1 episode) as Mrs. Visconti
 1993, Seinfeld (1 episode) as Mah-Jongg Lady
 1993, The Nanny (1 episode) as Woman at the Movie
 1995, Platypus Man (1 episode) as Marjorie McAllister
 1995 – 1996, Friends (3 episodes) as Mrs. Weinberg/Woman (uncredited)/Ms. Tedlock
 1997, Mad About You (1 episode) as Klarik's Customer

Film 
 How Do I Love Thee? (1970) as Mrs. Gromulka
 Chinatown (1974) as Mulwray's Secretary
 The New, Original Wonder Woman (1975) as Saleslady
 Cover Girls (1977) as Seamstress #1
 Mary Jane Harper Cried Last Night (1977) as Nancy West
 Like Normal People (1979) as Mrs. Peterson
 The Star Chamber (1983) as Judge Alice McCardle (uncredited)
 Trabbi Goes to Hollywood (1991) as Mrs. Peugeot
 3 Ninjas (1992) as Babysitter

References

External links
 

1924 births
2003 deaths
Actresses from Philadelphia
American stage actresses
American film actresses
American television actresses
20th-century American comedians
20th-century American actresses
21st-century American women
Comedians from Pennsylvania
Comedians from Florida
American people of Russian-Jewish descent
Jewish American actresses